This is a list of closed railway stations in Lancashire, a ceremonial county in North West England. It excludes stations that were in the historic county of Lancashire, but whose location is outside the modern-day county boundaries.

List

See also
 For other closed stations within the historic county boundaries of Lancashire (pre-1974) see:
 List of closed railway stations in Greater Manchester
 List of closed railway stations in Merseyside
 For open stations see:
 List of railway stations in Lancashire
 List of railway stations in Greater Manchester
 List of railway stations in Merseyside

References

 List
Lancashire
Lancashire closed railway stations